Peter John Roussel Luff FRSA FRGS (born 14 September 1946), is a British  campaigner and activist.  He has been active in a number of non-governmental organisations with varying goals.  He was a Director of the Royal Commonwealth Society  from 1997 to 2001, Director and Vice Chair of The European Movement UK, The International European Movement from 1986 to 1995, and Assistant Director of Amnesty International UK (1974–1978).

Personal life
He was born in Brussels on 14 September 1946, educated at Eltham College and Swansea University where he graduated in politics and international relations. In 2013, he completed a master's degree in The Study of Religions at the School of Oriental and African Studies (SOAS).

Career
His first post was with the Voluntary Committee on Overseas Aid and Development and subsequently as a Counselor with the UK Immigrants Advisory Service. He was appointed Assistant Director of Amnesty International UK in 1974, where he directed several country campaigns and organised the first UK Trades Union Human Rights conference. With John Cleese, he originated and produced ‘A Poke in the Eye’ and ‘The Mermaids Frolics’, the first two shows in The Secret Policeman's Ball (1979) comedy series. 

In 2002, he co-produced, with Caroline Warner, another comedy revue – ‘Peter Cook: a Posthumorous Tribute’ for The Peter Cook Foundation with a cast including David Frost, Terry Jones, Dilly Keane, Clive Anderson, Angus Deayton, David Baddiel, Josie Lawrence, Bonnie Langford and Mark Watson.

He was an assistant producer on the series Prisoners of Conscience at the BBC (1979–1981). Until 2001, Peter Luff was Director of the Royal Commonwealth Society, a pan-Commonwealth non-governmental organisation, supported by a worldwide membership, working to inform and educate people in all 54 member states about the work and importance of the Commonwealth.

He has written three books: The Simple Guide to Maastricht, The Reform of the United Nations with Georges Berthoin and A Brilliant Conspiracy – a study of the European federal agenda and a pamphlet.

Peter Luff is a Fellow of the Royal Society of Arts & Manufacturers and the Royal Geographical Society; a member of the Royal Institute for International Affairs and is a former Trustee of Responding to Conflict and the European Multicultural Foundation.

European Movement
Peter Luff was director of the European Movement between 1986 - 1992 , when he moved to become Vice-President and Deputy Secretary-General of the international European Movement in Brussels (1992-1995). He returned as Chair of the European Movement UK between 2004 and 2007 and worked during the referendum campaign as a special adviser to the Chair, Laura Sandys.

References

 http://www.climatecommunity.org
 http://www.euromove.org.uk
 http://www.euromove.org.uk/index.php?id=6620&tx_ttnews%5Btt_news%5D=1680&tx_ttnews%5BbackPid%5D=6336&cHash=16d3055a19
 https://web.archive.org/web/20080509070443/http://www.sussexineurope.org/treaty.htm

1946 births
Living people
People educated at Eltham College